Ecques is a commune in the Pas-de-Calais department in the Hauts-de-France region of France.

Geography
A large farming village situated 5 miles (8 km) south of Saint-Omer, at the D201 and D189 crossroads.

Population

Places of interest
 The church of St.Nicholas, dating from the twelfth century.

See also
Communes of the Pas-de-Calais department

References

External links

 Statistical data, INSEE

Communes of Pas-de-Calais